Salsa criolla (Creole salsa) is a type of sauce or relish found in Latin American cuisine, composed of finely chopped sliced onions, vinegar, tomatoes, garlic, chili peppers, bell peppers, olive oil, salt, pepper and fresh herbs like parsley or cilantro.  Salsa criolla is often associated with Peruvian cuisine, but also found in Cuban, Puerto Rican, Nicaraguan, Uruguayan,  and Argentinian cuisine.

In Peru, salsa criolla is a cold sauce typically used to accompany meat. The base composition is onion, red bell pepper and tomato, lime juice or vinegar and oil. Other ingredients can be cilantro, green bell pepper, parsley, garlic, etc.

References

Peruvian cuisine
Nicaraguan cuisine
Puerto Rican cuisine
Argentine cuisine
Uruguayan cuisine
Cuban cuisine
Salads
Sauces
Onion-based foods